Phillip "Rocky" McKenzie is an Aboriginal Australian actor from Broome, Western Australia. He played Willie in the film version of Bran Nue Dae. In 2010, he won a Deadly Award for Male Actor of the Year.

Early life

Career
In 2009, McKenzie role the character of Willie in the Australian musical comedy-drama film Bran Nue Dae alongside Jessica Mauboy, Ernie Dingo, Missy Higgins, Geoffrey Rush, Deborah Mailman, Tom Budge, Magda Szubanski, Ningali Lawford, and Dan Sultan.

Filmography

References

External links
 

Year of birth missing (living people)
Living people
Australian male child actors
Australian male film actors
Indigenous Australian male actors
People from Broome, Western Australia